Aginsky District is an administrative district (raion) Agin-Buryat Okrug of Zabaykalsky Krai, Russia, one of the thirty-one in the krai. It is located in the south of the krai, and borders with Karymsky District in the north, Mogoytuysky District in the east, Ononsky District in the south, and with Duldurginsky District in the west. Its administrative center is the urban locality (an urban-type settlement) of Aginskoye. Population:  29,511 (2002 Census);  The population of Aginskoye accounts for 45.4% of the district's total population.

History
The district was established on January 16, 1941.

Administrative and municipal status
Within the framework of administrative divisions, Aginsky District is one of the thirty-one in the krai. The urban-type settlement of Aginskoye serves as its administrative center.

As a municipal division, the territory of the district is split between two municipal formations—Aginsky Municipal District, to which two urban-type settlements and twenty of the administrative district's rural localities belong, and Aginskoye Urban Okrug, which covers the rest of the administrative district's territory, including the urban-type settlement of Aginskoye and the remaining rural locality.

References

Notes

Sources

Districts of Zabaykalsky Krai
States and territories established in 1941